Beauval Airport  is located  south-west of Beauval, Saskatchewan, Canada.

See also
List of airports in Saskatchewan

References

Registered aerodromes in Saskatchewan